Kunda is river in Estonia in Lääne-Viru County. The river is 65.8 km long and basin size is 535.9 km2. It runs into Gulf of Finland. This river is heavily modified by human activity.

There live also trouts and Thymallus thymallus.

See also
List of rivers of Estonia

References

Rivers of Estonia
Lääne-Viru County